John-Ragnar Aarset (born 18 December 1973 in Geilo) is a Norwegian politician for the Conservative Party.

Aarset was a member of the Hol municipal council from 1991 to 1995. During the period 1995 to 2002, he was a member of the Buskerud county council. From 1998 to 2000 he was the leader of the Young Conservatives (Unge Høyre), the youth wing of the Conservative Party.

He served in the position of deputy representative to the Parliament of Norway from Buskerud during the term 2001–2005 and 2005–2009.

In 2004, during the second cabinet Bondevik, Aarset was appointed political advisor in the Ministry of Local Government and Regional Development. He held the post until the change in government in 2005.

In 2013, upon the inauguration of Solberg's Cabinet, he was named a State Secretary in the Ministry of Transport and Communications.

Since December 2015 he is the Secretary-General of Høyre.

References 

1973 births
Living people
People from Hol
Deputy members of the Storting
Conservative Party (Norway) politicians
Buskerud politicians
Norwegian state secretaries